The Buller Rugby Union (BRU) is a rugby union province based in the town of Westport, New Zealand. The Buller provincial boundary also includes other notable towns such as Reefton, Karamea, Granity, Charleston, Punakaiki and Murchison (Murchison RFC currently compete in the Tasman provincial Union competition).

History
Buller was formed in 1894. Buller has played in both the second and third divisions of the former NPC. After the New Zealand Rugby Union (NZRU) restructuring of the NPC in 2006 Buller currently play in the Heartland Championship (effectively the NPC second division). The side has performed with distinction in this competition having made the top tier Meads Cup section twice in the past 3 seasons.
Buller (often in combination with West Coast) has had some memorable matches against international sides in the past including victory over Australia. There have also been a number of other impressive results against international opposition including the British Lions, South Africa, Tonga, Fiji, Samoa, and various New Zealand representative sides including New Zealand Maori and New Zealand Juniors.
Historically Buller were a strong provincial Union particularly in the pre 1960 era and the Union would compete on a level footing with more famous provincial sides such as Canterbury and Wellington. With the formation of the National Provincial Championship (NPC) in 1976 Buller began to struggle as players moved to bigger Unions to further their rugby and work careers. However the Union has experienced a resurgence in fortunes over the last 4 seasons with the representative team performing well in the Heartland Championship.

Clubs
Buller Rugby Union is made up of 5 clubs: 
 Ngakawau Rugby Football Club
 Old Boys Rugby Football Club
 Reefton Rugby Club
 Westport Rugby Football Club
 White Star Rugby Football Club

Buller also have 3 secondary schools who compete in matches:
 Buller High School
 Karamea Area School
 Reefton Area School

Squad
2018 Squad

The 2018 squad will be reduced after a couple of weeks training:
L Mundy
J Best
R Matangi
S Eggers
L Hateley
J Loughnan
A Ellis
G Duncan
R Bonisch
Z Walsh
C Neilsen
J Lepa
L Brownlee
K Parata
K Tetai
L Watson
S Godwin
B Pratt
D Rusbatch
L Elley
J Walter
P Foote
A Stephens
J Lash
R Malneek
I Ravudra
M Feso
P Saukuru
S Marris
M Kaloudigibeci
C Jenkins
B Collins
M Wells
A Tailua
J Hands
H Babbington
M McLaren
plus two to be added.

Unavailable: S Crackett, S Neighbours, A Norton-Taylor.

Playing ground
The Buller team's home ground is Victoria Square in Westport.

Buller in Super Rugby

Buller along with Canterbury, Tasman, West Coast, Mid Canterbury and South Canterbury make up the Crusaders Super Rugby franchise.

Championships
Buller has won one Provincial Championship, the Heartland Championship Lochore Cup in 2012 defeating South Canterbury in the Final.

In 2014, Buller went through Round Robin Undefeated progressing to the Meads Cup Final only to fall to Mid Canterbury.

Heartland Championship placings

Ranfurly Shield
Buller have never held the Ranfurly Shield despite a number of close matches. The best result being in 1949 when Buller drew 6–6 against Otago at Carisbrook, Dunedin. Had the match been played using the modern scoring system, Buller would have won courtesy of scoring more tries than their Otago opposition.

Seddon Shield
Established in 1906 in honour of Richard John Seddon, the Seddon Shield is a challenge shield contested by representative teams in the upper South Island. Buller along with Nelson Bays, Marlborough and West Coast currently compete for the shield. Originally the Golden Bay-Motueka Rugby Union and the Nelson Rugby Union also competed for the shield before those unions amalgamated to form Nelson Bays. Buller have held the shield on a number of occasions but Nelson Bays are the current holders. In 2009 Buller lost their Seddon Shield challenge against Nelson Bays by 29–37.

Rundle Cup
The Rundle Cup is contested annually between the Buller and West Coast Unions. It is one of the oldest trophies in NZ rugby.

The Rundle Cup was donated to the West Coast provincial union during their Annual General Meeting at the Albion Hotel on 24 May 1911 by William Rundle as a trophy for Buller-West Coast matches. Rundle was a local business man in the mining industry and former player for the Grey Football Club. He later perished on the frontline in France during World War One. The first contest for the cup was held in 1911 in Westport and was won by Buller.

Notable players

All Blacks
Buller has had six players selected for the All Blacks whilst playing their club rugby in Buller:

 Tom Fisher
 Edward Holder
 Charles McLean
 Bill Mumm
 Kenneth Svenson
 Robert Tunnicliff

Also:

 C. Green (selected for 1910 tour to Australia but was unable to tour)
 B. Stack (unused reserve for 1966 match vs British Lions)

Other All Blacks to play for Buller at senior or junior level either before or after their national selection were:
 George Aitken (1921 All Black captain and later a Scotland representative, played for Buller in 1914–15)
 Ben Blair (2001 All Black played for Buller at junior level)
 Bobby Black (An Otago All Black on 1914 Australia Tour, played for Buller after he settled in Westport after Australia Tour). 
 Sam Bligh (A 1910 All Black on Australian Tour, whilst playing his representative rugby for the West Coast. Played for Buller 1907–08,1911–13)
 John Corbett (1905 All Black whilst playing his representative rugby for the West Coast. Played for Buller from 1908–10)
 G.D.M. Gilbert (1935–36 All Black whilst playing his representative rugby for the West Coast. Played for Buller in 1930)
  Fred Newton (1905 All Black. Played one game for Buller in 1908)

New Zealand Māori/Natives representatives
 T.A. French (well-known Māori rugby administrator)
 A. Webster

New Zealand Sevens representatives
 S. Yates (2007–08 New Zealand Sevens representative played for Buller at junior level)

Buller centurions
The following players have made 100 appearances for Buller:
 John Brazil (103 games 1986–2000)
 Clark "Huck" Nelson (125 games 1996–2009)
 Luke Brownlee (200 games 1999–2018)
 Thomas Stuart (161 games 1984–1999)
 Philip Beveridge (175 games 1993–2017)
 Glenn Elley (115 games 1982–1997)
 Logan Mundy (123 games 2007–2019)
 Andrew Stephens (117 games 2007–2019)
 Michael Bonisch (100 games 1982–1994)
 John Gilbert (127 games 1971–1986)
 Orlando Nahr (123 games 1956–1973)
 Richard Banks (103 games 1973–1989)

References

External links
 Official Site
Buller rugby (NZHistory.net.nz)
Heartland Rugby website

New Zealand rugby union teams
New Zealand rugby union governing bodies
Sport in the West Coast, New Zealand
Westport, New Zealand
1894 establishments in New Zealand